The 1993 Tour de Suisse was the 57th edition of the Tour de Suisse cycle race and was held from 15 June to 24 June 1993. The race started in Affoltern am Albis and finished in Zürich. The race was won by Marco Saligari of the Ariostea team.

General classification

References

1993
Tour de Suisse